Terry Borcheller (born March 22, 1966, in Hialeah, Florida) is an American professional racing driver who races in the Grand American Road Racing Association Rolex Sports Car Series and American Le Mans Series.

As a teenager, Borcheller was the World Karting Association national champion in 1983. He began his professional career in the Barber Saab Pro Series in 1991. In 1998 he won the IMSA Speedvision cup in the GS class and the SPEED World Challenge T-1 class championship in a Saleen Mustang. In 2000 he captured the Rolex Sports Car Series GTO class championship in a Saleen Mustang. The following year he drove a Saleen S7R in the American Le Mans Series and won the GTS class championship. The following year he returned to the Rolex series and captured SRP II class honors in a Lola-Nissan. Following the realignment of that series class structure the following year, Borcheller was the champion of that series top class, Daytona Prototype in a Chevrolet powered Doran. The following year he won the 24 Hours of Daytona with teammates Christian Fittipaldi, Forest Barber, and Andy Pilgrim in a Pontiac powered Doran and finished 9th in the championship. He stayed with the Doran team through the 2006 season as the team began to fall behind the teams using the more heavily developed and popular Riley and Crawford chassis.

In 2007 he competed in a handful of races in various levels of Grand Am competition including DP, GT, and Koni Challenge as well as returning to ALMS to race for Team Trans Sport in 11 races in their GT2 class Porsche 911. In 2008 he drove in the 24 Hours of Daytona  in the Brumos Porsche then raced full-time in the ALMS in the Bell Motorsports GT1 class Aston Martin DBR9 as well as racing in the 24 Hours of Le Mans in the Team Modena DBR9. He also finished out the Rolex Sports Car Series season in the Autohaus Motorsports GT class Pontiac GXP.R

Borcheller has raced at Le Mans five times with a best finish of 3rd in class in 2001 with the Saleen S7R.

He is an avid participant in Christian motorsports ministries such as Racin' for Jesus. He and his family currently reside in Vero Beach, Florida.

Racing record

SCCA National Championship Runoffs

24 Hours of Le Mans results

External links
Official website
American Le Mans Series driver bio
Grand Am driver bio

External links
Driver DB Profile

1966 births
24 Hours of Daytona drivers
24 Hours of Le Mans drivers
American Le Mans Series drivers
Rolex Sports Car Series drivers
Living people
People from Hialeah, Florida
Racing drivers from Florida
Racing drivers from Miami
Indy Pro 2000 Championship drivers
WeatherTech SportsCar Championship drivers
SCCA National Championship Runoffs participants
Action Express Racing drivers
Level 5 Motorsports drivers
Michelin Pilot Challenge drivers